Line 6 of the Brussels Metro is a rapid transit line operated by STIB/MIVB, which connects King Baudouin metro station at the north-west of Brussels, Belgium to Simonis metro station at the north-west of the city center, then performing a counterclockwise loop around the center up to Simonis again. During this loop, the line runs under the small ring road of Brussels from Porte de Hal/Hallepoort station to Yser/IJzer metro station. It serves 25 metro stations and has 26 stops, metros on that line stopping twice at Simonis. It exists in its current form since 4 April 2009, when it replaced the former Line 1A between King Baudouin and Beekkant. The loop Simonis-Simonis is also served by line 2. The line has also a common section with lines 1 and line 5 between Gare de l'Ouest/Weststation and Beekkant. A connection with those lines is also possible at Arts-Loi/Kunst-Wet. Starting from King Baudouin, the line crosses the municipalities of the City of Brussels, Jette, Koekelberg, Molenbeek-Saint-Jean, Anderlecht and Saint-Gilles.

References

External links
STIB/MIVB official website

6
Anderlecht
City of Brussels
Jette
Koekelberg
Saint-Gilles, Belgium
Molenbeek-Saint-Jean